The 3-centimeter or 10 GHz band is a portion of the SHF (microwave) radio spectrum internationally allocated to amateur radio and amateur satellite use on a secondary basis.  The amateur radio band is between 10.00 GHz and 10.50 GHz, and the amateur satellite band is between 10.45 GHz and 10.50 GHz.  The allocations are the same in all three ITU regions.

List of notable frequencies 

10.3681 GHz Region 2 narrow band calling frequency
10.3682 GHz Region 1 narrow band calling frequency
10.3683 to 10.3684 GHz Region 2 propagation beacons
10.36875 to 10.36899 GHz Region 1 propagation beacons

Wideband FM Channels 
Common Wideband FM frequencies used with gunnplexers.Operation is in full-duplex with a 30 or 90 MHz split:
10.220 GHz
10.250 GHz †
10.280 GHz †
10.310 GHz
10.340 GHz
10.370 GHz ‡
10.400 GHz
10.430 GHz

† Most commonly used frequency pair for gunnplexers in North America. (10.200 to 10.300 GHz is reserved for gunnplexers in the ARRL Band Plan.)

‡ Should only be used if interference is not caused to narrow-band stations.

See also 
Amateur radio frequency allocations

References 

Amateur radio bands
Centimetric bands